Jailbreak is a 1936 American (Precursor) film noir, crime, mystery, drama film directed by Nick Grinde and written by Robert Hardy Andrews and Joseph Hoffman. The film stars Barton MacLane, June Travis, Craig Reynolds, Dick Purcell, Joe King, and George E. Stone. The film was released by Warner Bros. on August 5, 1936.

Plot
A ex-racketeer has a fight with a cop and goes to prison, and things happen when he tries to get paroled, and a newspaper reporter tries to figure it out.

Cast 
 Barton MacLane as Detective Captain Rourke
 June Travis as Jane Rogers
 Craig Reynolds as Ken Williams
 Dick Purcell as Ed Slayden 
 Joe King as Mike Eagan
 George E. Stone as Weeper
 Joseph Crehan as Warden
 Addison Richards as Dan Varner
 Eddie Acuff as Sig Patton
 Charles Middleton as Dan Stone
 Mary Treen as Gladys Joy
 Henry Hall as Pop Anderson
 Robert Emmett Keane as City Editor

References

External links
 

1936 films
1930s English-language films
American drama films
1936 drama films
Warner Bros. films
Films directed by Nick Grinde
American black-and-white films
1930s American films